The Fast and the Furious: Tokyo Drift (Original Motion Picture Soundtrack) is the soundtrack album to Justin Lin's 2006 action film The Fast and the Furious: Tokyo Drift. It was released on June 20, 2006 via Universal Motown. It features contributions from Don Omar, Teriyaki Boyz, Atari Teenage Riot, Brian Tyler, DJ Shadow, Dragon Ash, Evil Nine, Far East Movement, Mos Def, N.E.R.D., Tego Calderón and The 5.6.7.8's.

Track listing

Other songs 
"Bawitdaba" by Kid Rock plays during the first race in the film with Lucas Black's character Sean Boswell racing against Zachery Ty Bryan's character Clay. "Ooh Ahh (My Life Be Like)" by GRITS featuring Toby Mac was featured in the film during a scene with Bow Wow's character Twinkie; the song was originally released on the group's 2002 album "The Art of Translation" and was later remixed by Liquid Beat. Shonen Knife's cover of The Carpenters' "Top of The World" begins a scene where Sean and Neela sit to eat noodles together. "You'll Be Under My Wheels" by The Prodigy was used to lead into the film's end credits. None were included on the film's official soundtrack.

Charts

Film score 

The Fast and the Furious: Tokyo Drift (Original Score) was released on June 27 via Varèse Sarabande, a week after Original Motion Picture Soundtrack. It was recorded at Todd-AO Scoring Stage and composed by Brian Tyler.

References

External links

2006 soundtrack albums
Fast & Furious albums
Action film soundtracks
Albums produced by the Neptunes
Universal Motown Records albums